Dora Madison Burge, sometimes credited professionally as Madison Burge and Dora Madison, is an American actress. She is known for starring as Becky Sproles on the NBC/DirecTV drama Friday Night Lights from 2009 to 2011. She starred as Jessica "Chilli" Chilton on the NBC drama Chicago Fire from 2015 to 2016.

Personal life
Burge was born in Hutto, Texas, as the youngest of six children. She attended Round Rock Christian Academy and was accepted to the University of North Texas, but deferred to pursue an acting career.

Career
After appearing in a number of short films, in 2009, Burge made her television debut as Becky Sproles in the NBC/DirecTV drama Friday Night Lights in the fourth season until the show ended with the fifth season in 2011. According to a local interview, Burge said prior to being cast, she did not watch the show, but that did not limit her abilities when auditioning for the part as she was "so right on" for the role.

In 2011, Burge appeared in the religious sports drama Seven Days in Utopia, and appeared as Lexi Samuels in three episodes of the first season of the ABC Family drama The Lying Game.

Also in 2011, Burge appeared in the horror comedy Humans vs Zombies, based on the live action role-playing game.

In 2012, Burge appeared in the family movie Cowgirls n Angels and actually performed some of the stunts on horseback.

In 2013, she appeared in another family movie My Dog Champion.

In 2013, Burge appeared in My Jerusalem's music video "Mono". She also had a recurring role in the eighth and final season of the Showtime crime drama Dexter as Niki Walters, the daughter of Vince Masuka (C.S. Lee).

In 2014, Burge had a recurring role as Zoe in seven episodes of the short-lived CW science fiction romantic drama Star-Crossed, which starred her former Friday Night Lights co-stars Aimee Teegarden and Grey Damon. That same year, she played Dora in the Sasquatch horror film Exists directed by Eduardo Sánchez.

In 2015, Burge joined the cast of the NBC drama Chicago Fire (replacing Charlie Barnett who played Peter Mills) as Jessica "Chili" Chilton, the paramedic in charge in the third season. Burge was added to the main cast in the fourth season. In 2016, her character was written out of the show.

In 2017, she co-starred with James Van Der Beek as Karen in the short-lived Viceland sitcom What Would Diplo Do?.

Filmography

References

External links

Actresses from Texas
American child actresses
American film actresses
American television actresses
Living people
People from Williamson County, Texas
21st-century American actresses
Year of birth missing (living people)